Acossus populi, the aspen carpenterworm,  is a moth of the family Cossidae. It is found in the United States in Nevada, Colorado, California and in the northern Rocky Mountains. In Canada it is found in Ontario and British Columbia.

The wingspan is 50–68 mm.

The larvae feed on Populus species, mainly Populus tremuloides.

Subspecies
Acossus populi populi
Acossus populi angrezi (Bailey, 1882)
Acossus populi orc (Strecker, 1893)

References

Cossinae
Moths described in 1856
Moths of North America